Raye Hollitt (born April 17, 1964) is an American actress and  bodybuilder, also known by her stage name Zap, one of the original cast members of American Gladiators.

Biography
Hollitt graduated from Lake-Lehman High School in 1982, then worked as a paralegal for seven years.

She appeared in Season 1 of American Gladiators in 1989, taking off the second season (1990–91) for maternity leave, before returning for Season 3 and continuing on the show through 1995. She reappeared for an alumni show in the final season (1995–96).

Before she was famous as Zap, Hollitt was a contestant on the game show Card Sharks, and had a speaking role in Blake Edwards' 1989 film, Skin Deep.  Raye also did the pilot for JAG (Judge Advocate General) where she played a pilot, Cassie.  Raye also appeared on Baywatch, Blossom, and several other TV shows.  She and her husband, Kenn, now reside in South Lake Tahoe.

Bodybuilding career

Contest history

1987 NPC Extravaganza - 2nd (HW)
1988 NPC Junior USA Championship - 5th (HW)
1988 NPC Los Angeles Championship 1st (HW & Overall)
1992 NPC California Championship - 2nd (HW)
1992 NPC Nationals - 6th (HW)

Magazine covers
Women's Physique World, July 1988
Musclemag International, October 1991
Muscle Training Illustrated, May 1992
Musclemag International, December 1992
Musclemag International, January 1993
Muscular Development, February 1993
Muscular Development, February 1994
Women's Physique World, May/June 1995

Acting career

Filmography

Television work
Family Feud (1993/1994).  Episode - American Gladiators
Baywatch (1992).  Episode - Point Doom
JAG (1995).  Episodes - Pilot: Part 1; Pilot: Part 2
Muppets Tonight (1997).  Episode - The Gary Cahuenga Episode

References

External links
Raye Hollitt Official website
American Gladiators Zap Profile (GladiatorsTV.com)

MuscleSport Radio interview with Joe Pietaro, 7/7/09
Amazon.com Principal character "Cheryl Moray" in Ian A. Stuart's novel "Pursued" was inspired by Raye Hollitt

1964 births
Living people
American female bodybuilders
American film actresses
American television actresses
Contestants on American game shows
21st-century American women